was a town located in Namegata District, Ibaraki Prefecture, Japan. It is now a part of the city of Namegata.

As of 2003, the town had an estimated population of 10,916 and a density of 199.56 persons per km². The total area was 54.70 km².

On September 2, 2005, Kitaura, along with the towns of Asō and Tamatsukuri (all from Namegata District), were merged to create the city of Namegata and it ceases as an independent municipality.

External links
 Namegata Official website 

Dissolved municipalities of Ibaraki Prefecture